Benesa is a village in the Ouham region in the Central African Republic.

Nearby towns and villages include Banmba (9.8 nm), Vora (4.2 nm), Bankara (1.0 nm), Botokoni (1.4 nm) and Bouasi (1.4 nm).

References

External links
Satellite map at maplandia.com

Populated places in Ouham